Urania leilus, the green-banded urania, is a day-flying moth of the family Uraniidae. The species was first described by Carl Linnaeus in his 1758 10th edition of Systema Naturae. It is found in tropical South America east of the Andes, including Suriname, Guyana, French Guiana, eastern Colombia, Venezuela, eastern Ecuador, Brazil, northern Bolivia, eastern Peru, and Trinidad. It has been recorded as a vagrant to the central and northern Lesser Antilles such as St. Kitts, Barbados and Dominica.

It is sometimes confused with the similar U. fulgens, but that species is found west of the Andes in South America, Central America and Mexico, is slightly smaller and has less white to the "tail". The two have been treated as conspecific.

As appears to be the case for all Urania, the larvae of U. leilus feed exclusively on species of the toxic spurge Omphalea.

References

Uraniidae
Moths described in 1758
Taxa named by Carl Linnaeus
Uraniidae of South America
Moths of South America